Wittawat Sichean (Thai  วิธวรรธน์ สีชื่น) is a Thai footballer. He plays for Thailand Premier League's Chula United.

References

1985 births
Living people
Wittawat Sichean
Association football midfielders